Dictyosphaeria versluysii is a species of green algae (class Ulvophyceae) in the family Siphonocladaceae.

References

Siphonocladaceae
Species described in 1905